The 2022–23 Oregon Ducks men's basketball team represents the University of Oregon during the 2022–23 NCAA Division I men's basketball season. The Ducks, led by 13th-year head coach Dana Altman, play their home games at Matthew Knight Arena as members of the Pac–12 Conference.

Previous season

The Ducks finished the season 20–15, 11–9 in Pac-12 play to finish in a tie for 5th place for the regular season. They defeated Oregon State in the first round of the Pac-12 tournament before losing to Colorado in the quarterfinals. They did not receive an invitation to the NCAA tournament but did receive a bid to the NIT tournament as 4 seed in the Texas A&M.  They defeated Utah State 83–72 in their first round matchup and would be defeated in the second round by Texas A&M 60–75.

Off-season

Departures

Incoming transfers

2022 recruiting class

2023 recruiting class

Roster

Schedule and results

|-
!colspan=12 style=| Regular season

|-
!colspan=12 style=| Pac-12 tournament

|-
!colspan=12 style=| NIT

Player statistics

Awards & milestones

Season highs

Players 
Points:
Rebounds:
Assists:
Steals:
Blocks:
Minutes:

Team 
Points:
Field Goals:
Field Goal Attempts:
3 Point Field Goals Made:
3 Point Field Goals Attempts:
Free Throws Made:
Free Throws Attempts:
Rebounds:
Assists:
Steals:
Blocked Shots:
Turnovers:
Fouls:

Weekly awards

Pac-12 Conference awards and honors

Ranking movement

*AP does not release post-NCAA Tournament rankings.

References

Oregon Ducks men's basketball seasons
Oregon
Oregon Ducks men's basketball
Oregon Ducks men's basketball
Oregon